Miquel Delàs de Andres (born 13 April 1984) is a Spanish field hockey player who plays as a defender or midfielder for FC Barcelona and the Spanish national team. 

At the 2012 Summer Olympics, he competed for the national team in the men's tournament. He also competed for the team in the 2016 Summer Olympics tournament.

Club career
Miquel started playing hockey at a really young age at FC Barcelona. He left them in 2007 for Atlètic Terrassa HC because he wanted to win titles. After five seasons with Atlètic, he went to Belgium to play for Royal Antwerp, where he also played for five seasons. After ten years away from his boyhood club, he returned to Barcelona in 2017.

International career
The defender has been playing for the Spanish national team since 2005 and has registered 218 caps since. In 2017, he became the captain of the national team, which he is still today. He was selected for the 2018 World Cup, which was his third World Cup. He only played one game in that tournament because he got injured in the first match against Argentina. In August 2019, he was selected in the Spain squad for the 2019 EuroHockey Championship. They won the silver medal as they lost 5–0 to Belgium in the final. On 25 May 2021, he was selected in the squad for the 2021 EuroHockey Championship.

References

External links

1984 births
Living people
Spanish male field hockey players
Male field hockey defenders
Male field hockey midfielders
Field hockey players from Barcelona
2010 Men's Hockey World Cup players
Field hockey players at the 2012 Summer Olympics
2014 Men's Hockey World Cup players
Field hockey players at the 2016 Summer Olympics
2018 Men's Hockey World Cup players
Field hockey players at the 2020 Summer Olympics
Olympic field hockey players of Spain
Atlètic Terrassa players
Men's Belgian Hockey League players
División de Honor de Hockey Hierba players
Expatriate field hockey players
Spanish expatriate sportspeople in Belgium
20th-century Spanish people
21st-century Spanish people